Shauna L. Shapiro is a professor of psychology at Santa Clara University who works on mindfulness.

Education 

Shapiro graduated summa cum laude from Duke University, and received a Ph.D. in Clinical Psychology from the University of Arizona.  She completed a postdoctoral fellowship at the VA Palo Alto Health Care System She has received training in mindfulness-based cognitive therapy and mindfulness based stress reduction, as well as studied mindfulness meditation in monasteries in Nepal and Thailand.

Academic career 

Shapiro is a speaker, author and tenured professor at Santa Clara University's graduate department of Counseling Psychology.  Shapiro is also faculty at the Esalen Institute, and adjunct faculty at Andrew Weil's  Program of Integrative Medicine at the University of Arizona Medical Center (2000-2004).

Publications 

Shapiro has published over 150 peer-reviewed journal articles and book chapters. Additionally, Shapiro (along with Linda E. Carlson) is the co-author of the texts The Art and Science of Mindfulness: Integrating Mindfulness into Psychology and the Helping Professions and (along with Chris White) of "Mindful Discipline: A Loving Approach to Setting Limits and Raising an Emotionally Intelligent Child."

References

External links

Santa Clara Faculty Page
Dr Shauna Shapiro Website

21st-century American psychologists
American women psychologists
Duke University alumni
Mindfulness (psychology)
Positive psychologists
Santa Clara University faculty
University of Arizona alumni
Living people
1974 births
American women academics
21st-century American women